St. Anthony of Padua Cathedral, also Governador Valadares Cathedral, is the cathedral of the Roman Catholic Diocese of Governador Valadares, located in the city of Governador Valadares, in the state of Minas Gerais, Brazil. 

Dedicated to St. Anthony of Padua, it is located in Manuel Nunes Coelho Square, in the center of the city.

History
The Chapel of Santo Antonio, built between 1910 and 1914, was the base of the local Catholic community and became the seat of the Parish of Santo Antonio de Figueira do Rio Doce in 1915. At that time, parish life began with records dated November 10 of the same year, signed by Frei Angelico de Campora Capuchinho. Until then there was a simple chapel, also dedicated to St. Anthony of Padua, built around 1886. The construction of the present cathedral began in 1924, under the coordination of the parson for the time, Sady Rabelo. The church was designated cathedral when the Diocese of Governador Valadares was erected on February 1, 1956.

See also
Roman Catholicism in Brazil
St. Anthony of Padua

References

Roman Catholic cathedrals in Minas Gerais
Roman Catholic churches completed in 1886
19th-century Roman Catholic church buildings in Brazil